The 2018 season was Terengganu's first season in the Malaysia Super League since the rebranding in 2017.

Coaching staff

Squad information

Transfers

In 
1st leg

2nd leg

Out
1st leg

Pre-season and friendlies

Tour of Cambodia

MB Terengganu Cup

Competitions

Malaysia Super League

League table

Results by matchday

Matches

Malaysia FA Cup

Malaysia Cup

Group stage

Knock-stage

Quarter-finals

Semi-finals

Finals

Statistics

Appearances and goals

‡ Players who played for both Terengganu I and Terengganu II.

Clean sheets

References

External links
 Terengganu F.C. Official website

Terengganu FC seasons
Malaysian football clubs 2018 season
Malaysian football club seasons by club